Seamans may refer to:

People
Clarence Seamans, an American typewriter manufacturer
Hubert Seamans, a Canadian businessman
Robert Seamans, an American administrator at NASA
Sam Seamans, an Assisting Bishop in the Reformed Episcopal Church

Ships
Robert C. Seamans (ship), a steel brigantine